Vincenzellus is a genus of narrow-waisted bark beetles in the family Salpingidae. There are at least two described species in Vincenzellus.

Species
These two species belong to the genus Vincenzellus:
 Vincenzellus elongatus (Mannerheim, 1852)
 Vincenzellus ruficollis (Panzer, 1794)

References

Further reading

External links

 

Salpingidae
Articles created by Qbugbot